Delcombe Manor is a Grade II*-listed manor in Milton Abbas, Dorset, England.

History
The manor was built circa 1750 using flint and stone from Milton Abbey. It was originally two separate cottages which were joined. It was designed in the Romantic Gothic architectural style.

In 1929 it was purchased by merchant banker Charles Jocelyn Hambro, who lived there with his wife Pamela Hambro and their children, including his son Charles.

Architectural significance
The manor is listed as Grade II* by Historic England; the listing was applied on 14 July 1955.

References

Grade II* listed buildings in Dorset
 
Grade II* listed houses
Country houses in Dorset
Gothic architecture in England
Houses completed in 1750